The 1981 Girabola was the third season of top-tier football competition in Angola. The season ran from 9 May 1981 to 7 February 1982.

The league comprised 14 teams, the bottom three of which were relegated.

Primeiro de Agosto were the defending champions and were crowned champions, winning their 3rd title, while Desportivo da Chela, FC do Uíge, Ferroviário da Huíla and Petro do Huambo were relegated.

Joseph Maluka of Primeiro de Maio finished as the top scorer with 20 goals.

Changes from the 1980 season
Diabos Verdes were renamed as Leões de Luanda.
Relegated: Palancas do Huambo, Sagrada Esperança, Sassamba da LS, Welwitschia
Promoted: Petro de Luanda, Petro do Huambo, Primeiro de Maio, Progresso do Sambizanga

Legal disputes
Leões de Luanda won a claim against Petro de Luanda for the latter fielding ineligible player João Machado (he was supposed to be suspended for a double yellow card) in their first leg match for the 8th round played on July 11. Petro had originally won the game by 2-1. As a result, Leões were awarded 2 pts and Petro subsequently forfeited 2 pts.

In another case, the so-called Caso Rafael, in which Leões de Luanda fielded an ineligible player named Rafael, Leões de Luanda forfeited a total five points and was therefore relegated. Subsequently, all clubs involved in games where such player took part were awarded the lost points as follows: Mambroa (2 pts), FC Uíge (2 pts) and Desportivo da Chela (1 pt).

In another dispute, Desportivo da Chela was awarded 1 point as a result of the so-called Caso Felix, in its claim against Ferroviário da Huíla. Subsequently, Ferroviário forfeited 1 pt.

League table

Results

Positions by round

Source: Girabola

Season statistics

Top scorers

Most goals scored in a single match

Champions

References

External links
Federação Angolana de Futebol

Angola
Angola
Girabola seasons